Russian River Brewing Company is a brewery and brewpub in downtown Santa Rosa, California, with a second location in Windsor. The company is known for strong India pale ales and sour beers.

History

Russian River Brewing Company was created in 1997 when Korbel Champagne Cellars of Guerneville, California decided to try their hand at brewing beer. Brewer Vinnie Cilurzo was hired as brewmaster. Brettanomyces, Cilurzo's favorite component of lambic beers, were first used with local wine barrels in 1999 for production of sour beers. Korbel quit the brewing business, and sold the brewery to Cilurzo and his wife Natalie in 2002. Russian River, remodeled and expanded in 2004, eventually moving to Santa Rosa, at their current 4th Street location. Cilurzo is regarded as one of the most innovative microbrewers in the country and credited with inventing the beer style Double India Pale Ale, known alternately as Imperial IPA, when he was the head brewer at Blind Pig Brewing Company in Temecula, California.

Plans to open a second location in Windsor, just north of Santa Rosa, began before the 2017 Sonoma County fires. In 2016, the Cilurzos partnered with Comerica to finance the project, and the Windsor Planning Commission approved the new brewery, pub, and restaurant the following year. By September 2018 the new brewery was completed and operational. The Windsor facility opened its doors to customers that October. The Windsor facility is differentiated from the Santa Rosa location by its larger size, free parking, expanded menu, and guided brewery tour. The Cilurzos hoped that the two locations would give tourists and local customers the opportunity "to come and spread out and enjoy the experience on their own terms," especially during the annual Pliny the Younger release, which sometimes resulted in lines around the block. Windsor officials hoped that the new location would be a financial boon and make the city more attractive for similar businesses, and the city's "Windsor Hopper" shuttle service, linking local hotels, wineries, and breweries, was unveiled coinciding with the 2019 Pliny release.

Production
In addition to the 20 barrel brewpub (capable of about 3000 barrels per year), Russian River also has a 50 barrel production brewery, originally from Dogfish Head Brewery. In late 2014, the production facility is being updated with a four vessel, 50 barrel brewhouse made by AAA Metal Fabrication in Beaverton, Ore. Russian River has distributors in California, Colorado, Oregon, and Pennsylvania. The company also distributes to 500 restaurants, bars, and other stores.  A coolship is used to cool the wort for some of the beers. Barrels of beer are stored in their barrel warehouse and begin tasting after 9 months, though can be aged up to two years before blending.

Beers

American style

 Aud Blonde - Blonde Ale
 Beer Esteam - California Common Steam Beer
 Blind Pig IPA - India Pale Ale
 Dead Leaf Green - English-Style Pale Ale
 Gaffers - English-Style Pale Ale
 Great Beer/Great Wine - Winemaker Session Ale
 Happy Hops - India Pale Ale
 Hop2It - Single Hop Ale (Rotating)
 Hopfather IPA - India Pale Ale
 HUGElarge Pils - Pilsner
 O.V.L. Stout - Dry Irish Stout (100% nitrogen)
 Pliny the Elder - Double India Pale Ale
 Pliny the Younger - Triple India Pale Ale
 Pliny for President - Double Dry-Hopped India Pale Ale
 Row 2 Hill 56 - American Pale Ale (Single Hop: Simcoe)
 Russian River IPA - India Pale Ale
 Russian River Porter - Porter
 Segal Select - Pale Ale (Hops from Segal Ranch)
 Shadow of a Doubt - Imperial Porter

Belgian style

 Benediction - Abbey-style Double
 Damnation - Golden Ale
 Damnation Batch 23 - Belgian gold aged with oak chips
 Defenestration - Hoppy Blonde Ale
 Deification - Pale Ale
 Erudition - Saison
 Little White Lie - Witbier
 Mortification - Quadrupel
 Perdition - Bier de Sonoma
 Publication - Saison
 Redemption - Blonde Ale
 Rejection - Black Ale
 Salvation - Strong Dark Ale

Barrel aged
(All of Russian River's barrel-aged beers contain brettanomyces, many contain lactobacillus and pediococcus)

 Beatification - Spontaneously fermented beer
 Compunction - Aged with pluots
 Consecration - Strong dark ale aged in Cabernet Sauvignon barrels with black currants
 Framboise For A Cure - Blonde ale aged in chardonnay barrels with raspberries
 Propitiation - Porter
 Sanctification - Blonde aged in stainless steel tanks with 100% Brettanomyces
 Supplication - Brown Ale aged in pinot noir barrels
 Temptation - Blonde Ale aged in chardonnay barrels
 Toronado 20th Anniversary - A blend of 6 aged beers
 Toronado 25th Anniversary - A blend of 6 aged beers

Collaboration
 Brux (with Sierra Nevada)
 Collaboration Not Litigation (with Avery, a result of a conflict between the two breweries, both of which made a beer called Salvation)

Awards
Russian River Brewing Company and Vinnie Cilurzo have won numerous awards for their beer.

 1999 Great American Beer Festival - "Small Brewing Company of the Year"
 1999 Great American Beer Festival - "Small Brewing Company Brewmaster of the Year"
 2004 World Beer Cup - "Large Brewpub Champion Brewery"
 2004 World Beer Cup - "Large Brewpub Champion Brewmaster"
 2005 Malt Advocate - "Brewery of the Year"
 2006 World Beer Cup - "Large Brewpub Champion Brewery"
 2006 World Beer Cup - "Large Brewpub Champion Brewmaster"
 2008 Russell Schehrer Award - Awarded to Vinnie Cilurzo for "Innovation in Craft Brewing"

Individual beer awards

See also

 California breweries

References

Footnotes

Sources

External links
 Official website

Beer brewing companies based in the San Francisco Bay Area
Companies based in Santa Rosa, California
1997 establishments in California